Alwin John "Dougie" McGregor (1889–1963) was a dual-code rugby footballer who represented New Zealand in both rugby union and rugby league.

Rugby union career
McGregor played rugby union for the Karangahake club in the Goldfields sub-union competition in 1908. The following year he moved to Auckland, joining the Ponsonby club. McGregor represented Auckland and the North Island that same year.

In 1913 McGregor was picked in the New Zealand squad for their North America tour and played in 11 games during the tour, including Test matches against Australia and the United States.

Rugby league career
In 1915 McGregor switched codes to rugby league, playing in the Auckland Rugby League competition for Grafton Athletic alongside Karl Ifwersen, and McGregors younger brother John Wylie McGregor. He played for them from 1915 to 1919 before switching to the Ponsonby United. He played at both clubs with another brother Eric Esdaile McGregor who was also a very accomplished player and the top try scorer in the Auckland club competition in 1918 along with appearing for Auckland.

Dougie McGregor represented Auckland on 2 occasions. His debut was against Thames in 1915 where he scored a try in a 27-16 win at Victoria Park in front of 4,000 spectators. Auckland played almost no representative fixtures during World War I so his next representative match was against Canterbury in a 45-9 win at the Auckland Domain on September 14, 1918. He played again for Auckland against Hawkes Bay at Eden Park in a 38-13 win where he scored a try. McGregor also played for the Auckland Provincial team against Australia at the Auckland Domain on September 20. Australia ran out comfortable 32-8 victors. He played in 9 matches for New Zealand. Seven of these were on the 1919 New Zealand tour of Australia and were followed by two test appearance against the Australian side who toured a month later.

Later years
McGregor was later a rugby league coach in Auckland and Otago.

Family
McGregors uncle, Dick, played for the All Blacks between 1901 and 1904 while his nephew, Ron, played for the Kiwis between 1947 and 1948.

References

1889 births
1963 deaths
Auckland rugby league team players
Auckland rugby union players
Dual-code rugby internationals
Grafton Athletic players
New Zealand international rugby union players
New Zealand national rugby league team players
New Zealand people of Scottish descent
New Zealand rugby league coaches
New Zealand rugby league players
New Zealand rugby union players
North Island rugby union players
Ponsonby Ponies players
Rugby league players from Thames, New Zealand
Rugby league wingers
Rugby union players from Thames, New Zealand